Theretra suffusa is a moth of the family Sphingidae.

Distribution 
It is known from Nepal, north-eastern India, Thailand, southern China, Taiwan, southern Japan (Ryukyu Archipelago), Laos, Cambodia, Vietnam, the Andaman Islands, Malaysia (Peninsular, Sarawak, Sabah), Singapore, Indonesia (Sumatra, Java, Kalimantan) and Palawan.

Description 
The wingspan is 80–102 mm. It is similar to Theretra alecto but recognizable by the broad pale dorsal stripe running along the thorax and abdomen, and the black basal patch of the hindwing upperside not extending towards the tornus. The forewing upperside is also similar to Theretra alecto but the contrast between the paler basal and median area and the darker postmedian area is stronger.

Biology 
The larvae feed on Melastoma sanguineum in India.

References

Theretra
Moths described in 1856
Moths of Japan